Cytochrome P450 4A11 is a protein that in humans is codified by the CYP4A11 gene.

Function 

This gene encodes a member of the cytochrome P450 superfamily of enzymes. The cytochrome P450 proteins are monooxygenases which catalyze many reactions involved in drug metabolism and synthesis of cholesterol, steroids and other lipids. This protein localizes to the endoplasmic reticulum and hydroxylates medium-chain fatty acids such as laurate and myristate.

CYP4A11 is highly expressed in the liver and kidney.

CYP4A11 along with CYP4A22, CYP4F2, and CYP4F3 metabolize arachidonic acid to 20-Hydroxyeicosatetraenoic acid (20-HETE) by an Omega oxidation reaction with the predominant 20-HETE-synthesizing enzymes in humans being CYP4F2 followed by CYP4A11; 20-HETE regulates blood flow, vascularization, blood pressure, and kidney tubule absorption of ions in rodents and possibly humans.    
  Gene polymorphism variants of CYP4A11 are associated with the development of hypertension and cerebral infarction (i.e. ischemic stroke) in humans (see 20-Hydroxyeicosatetraenoic acid). In its capacity to form hydroxyl fatty acid, CYP4A11 is classified as a CYP monooxygease. Sesamin, the major lignan found in sesame, inhibits CYP4A11, which leads to decrease of plasma and urinary levels of 20-HETE. A study have found that sesamin inhibits human renal and liver microsome 20-HETE synthesis.

CYP4A11 also has epoxygenase activity in that it metabolizes docosahexaenoic acid to epoxydocosapentaenoic acids (EDPs; primarily 19,20-epoxy-eicosapentaenoic acid isomers [i.e. 19,20-EDPs]) and eicosapentaenoic acid to epoxyeicosatetraenoic acids (EEQs, primarily 17,18-EEQ isomers). CYP4A11 does not convert arachidonic acid to epoxides. CYP4F8 and CYP4F12 likewise possess both monooxygenase activity for arachidonic acid and epoxygenase activity for docosahexaenoic and eicosapentaenoic acids. In vitro studies on human and animal cells and tissues and in vivo animal model studies indicate that certain EDPs and EEQs (16,17-EDPs, 19,20-EDPs, 17,18-EEQs have been most often examined) have actions which often oppose those of 20-HETE, principally in the areas of blood pressure regulation, blood vessel thrombosis, and cancer growth (see 20-Hydroxyeicosatetraenoic acid, Epoxyeicosatetraenoic acid, and Epoxydocosapentaenoic acid sections on activities and clinical significance).  These studies also indicate that the EPAs and EEQs are: 1) more potent than the CYP450 epoxygenase (e.g. CYP2C8, CYP2C9, CYP2C19, CYP2J2, and CYP2S1)-formed epoxides of arachidonic acid (termed EETs) in decreasing hypertension and pain perception; 2) more potent than or at least equal in potency to the EETs in suppressing inflammation; and 3) act oppositely from the EETs in that they inhibit angiogenesis, endothelial cell migration, endothelial cell proliferation, and the growth and metastasis of human breast and prostate cancer cell lines whereas EETs have stimulatory effects in each of these systems. Consumption of omega-3 fatty acid-rich diets dramatically raises the serum and tissue levels of EDPs and EEQs in animals as well as humans and in humans are by far the most prominent change in the profile of PUFA metabolites caused by dietary omega-3 fatty acids.

Members of the CYP4A and CYP4F sub-families and CYP2U1 may also ω-hydroxylate and thereby reduce the activity of various fatty acid metabolites of arachidonic acid including LTB4, 5-HETE, 5-oxo-eicosatetraenoic acid, 12-HETE, and several prostaglandins that are involved in regulating various inflammatory, vascular, and other responses in animals and humans. This hydroxylation-induced inactivation may underlie the proposed roles of the cytochromes in dampening inflammatory responses and the reported associations of certain CYP4F2 and CYP4F3 single nucleotide variants with human Krohn's disease and Coeliac disease, respectively.

T8590C single nucleotide polymorphism (SNP), rs1126742, in the CYPA411 gene produces a protein with significantly reduced catalytic activity due to a loss-of-function mechanism; this SNP has been associated with hypertension in some but not all population studies. This result could be due to a decline in the production of EEQs and EPDs, which as indicated above, have blood pressure lowering actions.

References

External links

Further reading